The following article presents a summary of the 2012 association football season in Brazil, which was the 111th season of competitive football in the country.

Campeonato Brasileiro Série A

The 2012 Campeonato Brasileiro Série A started on May 20, 2012, and concluded on December 2, 2012.

Fluminense declared as the Campeonato Brasileiro Série A champions.

Relegation
The four worst placed teams, which are Sport, Palmeiras, Atlético Goianiense and Figueirense, were relegated to the following year's second level.

Campeonato Brasileiro Série B

The 2012 Campeonato Brasileiro Série B started on May 19, 2012, and concluded on November 24, 2012.

Goiás declared as the Campeonato Brasileiro Série B champions.

Promotion
The four best placed teams, which are Goiás, Criciúma, Atlético Paranaense and Vitória, were promoted to the following year's first level.

Relegation
The four worst placed teams, which are CRB, Guarani, Ipatinga and Grêmio Barueri, were relegated to the following year's third level.

Campeonato Brasileiro Série C

The 2012 Campeonato Brasileiro Série C started on June 30, 2012, and concluded on December 1, 2012.

Águia de Marabá
Brasiliense
Caxias
Chapecoense
Cuiabá
Duque de Caxias
Fortaleza
Guarany de Sobral
Icasa
Luverdense
Macaé
Madureira
Oeste
Paysandu
Salgueiro
Santa Cruz
Santo André
Treze
Tupi
Vila Nova

The Campeonato Brasileiro Série C final was played between Oeste and Icasa.

Oeste declared as the league champions by aggregate score of 2–0.

Promotion
The four best placed teams, which are Oeste, Icasa, Paysandu and Chapecoense, were promoted to the following year's second level.

Relegation
The four worst placed teams, which are Salgueiro, Santo André, Guarany de Sobral and Tupi, were relegated to the following year's fourth level.

Campeonato Brasileiro Série D

The 2012 Campeonato Brasileiro Série D started on June 23, 2012, and concluded on October 21, 2012.

Aparecidense
Aracruz
Araguaína
Arapongas
Atlético Acreano
Baraúnas 
Brasil de Pelotas
Campinense
Ceilândia
CENE
Cerâmica
Cianorte
Comercial (PI)
CRAC
CSA
Feirense
Friburguense
Guarani (MG)
Horizonte
Interporto
Itabaiana
Juventude
Marcílio Dias
Marília
Metropolitano
Mirassol
Mixto
Mogi Mirim
Nacional (MG)
Náutico (RR)
Penarol
Petrolina
Remo
Sampaio Corrêa
Santos (AP)
Sousa
Vilhena
Vitória da Conquista
Volta Redonda
Ypiranga (PE)

The Campeonato Brasileiro Série D final was played between CRAC and Sampaio Corrêa.

Sampaio Corrêa declared as the league champions by aggregate score of 3–1.

Promotion
The four best placed teams, which are Sampaio Corrêa, CRAC, Baraúnas and Mogi Mirim, were promoted to the following year's third level.

Copa do Brasil

The 2012 Copa do Brasil started on March 7, 2012, and concluded on July 11, 2012. The Copa do Brasil final was played between Palmeiras and Coritiba.

Palmeiras declared as the cup champions by aggregate score of 3–1.

State championship champions

Youth competition champions

(1) The Copa Nacional do Espírito Santo Sub-17, between 2008 and 2012, was named Copa Brasil Sub-17. The similar named Copa do Brasil Sub-17 is organized by the Brazilian Football Confederation and it was first played in 2013.

Other competition champions

Brazilian clubs in international competitions

Brazil national team
The following table lists all the games played by the Brazilian national team in official competitions and friendly matches during 2012.

Women's football

National team
The following table lists all the games played by the Brazil women's national football team in official competitions and friendly matches during 2012.

The Brazil women's national football team competed in the following competitions in 2012:

Copa do Brasil de Futebol Feminino

The 2012 Copa do Brasil de Futebol Feminino started on March 3, 2012, and concluded on June 10, 2012.

São José declared as the cup champions by aggregate score of 5–2.

Domestic competition champions

Brazilian clubs in international competitions

References

 Brazilian competitions at RSSSF

 
Seasons in Brazilian football
Brazil